Čikagos Aidas (English: Echo of Chicago) is one of the largest Lithuanian-language weekly newspapers published abroad. It is distributed free of charge in the Chicago area of the United States. The full newspaper is available online and it also has its own radio station.

External links
 Čikagos Aidas Homepage 

Publications established in 2003
Free newspapers
Lithuanian-language newspapers published in the United States
Lithuanian-American culture in Chicago
Newspapers published in Chicago
Non-English-language newspapers published in Illinois